"I've Seen That Face Before (Libertango)" is a single by Jamaican singer Grace Jones, released in 1981. The song is a reworking of Astor Piazzolla's "Libertango".

Background
The song juxtaposes "Libertango", an Argentine tango classic written by composer and bandoneonist Astor Piazzolla (first recorded by Piazzolla himself in 1974), against a tango, reggae and chanson sound and new lyrics penned by Jones herself and Barry Reynolds. Lyrically, it describes the darker side of Parisian nightlife. The song includes spoken parts in French: "Tu cherches quoi ? À rencontrer la mort ? Tu te prends pour qui ? Toi aussi tu détestes la vie..." which translates "What are you looking for? For death? Who do you think you are? You hate life, you too..." Jones also recorded a Spanish language version of the track entitled "Esta cara me es conocida", and an English version with the French passage recited in Portuguese.

Recorded in Nassau, Bahamas, with Sly and Robbie, Wally Badarou, Barry Reynolds, Mikey Chung, and Uziah "Sticky" Thompson, aka the Compass Point Allstars under Chris Blackwell's and Alex Sadkin's direction, "I've Seen That Face Before" was released as the second single from Jones' album Nightclubbing, after "Demolition Man" made no chart impact. It met with a commercial success, reaching Top 20 in no fewer than five European countries, including number 1 in Belgium, and now counts as one of Jones' signature tunes. A longer version of the song was released on a 12" single, which is available on the Grand 12-Inches 7 CD compilation, compiled by Ben Liebrand, and also Movie Klub 80: Episode 3 compilation CD (4 Ever Music/Warner Music Poland).

The song was featured in key moments of the 1988 thriller movie Frantic, set in Paris, directed by Roman Polanski and starring Harrison Ford. The track however did not make it onto the film's accompanying soundtrack album. It also features in Raw Deal and the second episode of the first season of the TV series Pose.

"I've Seen That Face Before (Libertango)" has been described as "one of the highlights of Nightclubbing" and "one of the highlights of Jones' musical career".

Music video
The song is famous for its music video, directed by Jean-Paul Goude. It begins with a picture of Grace wearing a tall black hat and her face concealed under a three-piece paper mask. These are then removed and her trademark flattop haircut is displayed. Jones then starts to perform the song, singing straight into the camera, and plays accordion. The camera then zooms out, revealing that the video set is located on the roof of a tower block. The single cover recreates an image from the clip. The video is the closing track on Jones' classic A One Man Show music documentary.

Track listing
7" single
A. "I've Seen That Face Before (Libertango)" – 4:29
B. "Warm Leatherette" – 4:25

7" single
A. "I've Seen That Face Before" – 4:30
B. "Demolition Man" – 4:32

7" ES single
A. "Esta cara me es conocida (I've Seen That Face Before (Libertango))" – 4:32
B. "El demoledor (Demolition Man)" – 3:31

12" single
A. "I've Seen That Face Before (Libertango)" – 5:32
B. "Warm Leatherette" – 4:25

12" single
A. "I've Seen That Face Before (Libertango)" – 5:36
B. "Pull Up to the Bumper" – 5:01

 '7" Brazilian single
A. "I've Seen That Face Before (Libertango)" (Sung in Portuguese) - 4:30
B. "Warm Leatherette" - 4:25

Chart performance

Weekly charts

Year-end charts

Cover versions
 Artists who have recorded the song with Jones' reggae arrangement and sometimes also translated lyrics include Kirsty MacColl, Julien Clerc, Guy Marchand, Caroline Nin, Herb Alpert, Gary Burton, Al Di Meola, Richard Galliano, Camilla Henemark, Yo-Yo Ma, Viola Valentino, Iva Zanicchi, Clare Fader, and The Tango Saloon. A cover version of this song by Eindhoven-based singer Kovacs from the Netherlands pitched her career. 
 Polish singer Kayah covered the song for her 2010 CD Kayah & Royal Quartet'', a collaboration album with Royal String Quartet.

References

1981 singles
Grace Jones songs
Macaronic songs
Songs written for films
Tangos
Ultratop 50 Singles (Flanders) number-one singles
1981 songs
Songs written by Barry Reynolds